Alumni Hall, also known as Chapel Hall, is a historic multipurpose building located on the campus of Alfred University at Alfred in Allegany County, New York.  It is a large frame structure built in 1851–1852 with what has been described as Alfred's most important Greek Revival features.   The three-story,  by  rectangular structure has a red terra cotta roof. Designed and built by Maxson Stillman, it features a one of a kind 12 foot pine weathervane in the shape of a quill pen.   It was the fourth structure built for the Alfred Academy and housed a chapel, auditorium and lecture, recitation, library and lyceum rooms for college and community use. It is now used primarily to house the Admissions Department.

It was listed on the National Register of Historic Places in 1985.

References

External links
Alfred University website

Alfred University
School buildings on the National Register of Historic Places in New York (state)
Greek Revival architecture in New York (state)
School buildings completed in 1852
Buildings and structures in Allegany County, New York
National Register of Historic Places in Allegany County, New York
1852 establishments in New York (state)